Sudhir Mukerjee (16 November 1913 – 10 September 1997), better known as Dada Mukerjee, was an Indian writer who was professor of Economics at Allahabad University, Uttar Pradesh, India. He is best known as a close devotee of Neem Karoli Baba (known to his devotees as Maharajji). Starting 14 July 1958, when they moved into the "Red House" at No. 4 Church Lane, Neem Karoli resided with Mukerjee and his wife Kamala (or Didi, elder sister) during the winters. This continued until Neem Karoli's death in 1973.

After Neem Karoli's death, Mukerjee wrote two English-language books about him: By His Grace: A Devotee's Story, and The Near and the Dear: Stories of Neem Karoli Baba and His Devotees. These works are, in part, autobiographical as well. Mukerjee is also mentioned in passing in Ram Dass's book Miracle of Love: Stories about Neem Karoli Baba.

Mukerjee and Jawaharlal Nehru were college classmates. There is at least one existing picture of them together, which is published in By His Grace: A Devotee's Story.

Works

Notes

References 

1913 births
1997 deaths
Academic staff of the University of Allahabad
Writers from Allahabad
Hindu writers
Bengali Hindus
Indian spiritual writers
20th-century Indian non-fiction writers